455th may refer to:

455th Air Expeditionary Wing, provisional United States Air Force USAFCENT unit
455th Flying Training Squadron, United States Air Force unit of the Air Education and Training Command (AETC)

See also
455 (number)
455 (disambiguation)
455, the year 455 (CDLV) of the Julian calendar
455 BC